Womens Bay or Womens Bay may refer to:

 Womens Bay, Alaska, a census-designated place in Kodiak Island Borough, Alaska, in the United States
 Womens Bay, a bay of the Chiniak Bay of the Gulf of Alaska on the east side of Kodiak Island, Alaska, United States
 Women's Bay, Barbados, also known as Silver Sands, in the south of the island of Barbados